Bécassine is a French comic strip and the name of its heroine, appearing for the first time in the first issue of La Semaine de Suzette on February 2, 1905. She is considered one of the first female protagonists in the history of French comics.

Bécassine is one of the most enduring French comics of all time, iconic in its home country, and with a long history in syndication and publication.

Character

The character Bécassine is a young Breton housemaid, usually depicted wearing a green dress pastiching traditional Breton peasant costume, with lace coiffe and clogs. She is said to come from Finistère, the area most associated with traditional Breton culture. However, her clothing has non-Breton elements, reminiscent of the local costume of Picardy. She is usually portrayed without a mouth.

Seen as a stereotype and remnant of the contempt with which the Bretons were long seen, she is the typical provincial girl as seen by the more refined city people of Paris, the target audience of the young girls' magazine La Semaine de Suzette. But over the course of the stories, and coupled with the success she has, she is depicted more and more favourably. "Bécassine" is a nickname, derived from the French word for a number of birds of the family of the snipe, which is also used as a way of saying "fool" in French.

History
Initially made as filler for a blank page, the story, written by Jacqueline Rivière and drawn by Joseph Pinchon, was such a success that new pages regularly appeared, still in the guise of page fillers.

Only in 1913 did Bécassine become the heroine of more structured stories. Still drawn by  Pinchon, the stories were then written by Caumery (pseudonym of Maurice Languereau), one of the associates of Gautier-Languereau, the publisher of La Semaine de Suzette. At that time, the character's real name was revealed to be Annaïck Labornez, her nickname coming from her home village, called Clocher-les-Bécasses.

Between 1913 and 1950, 27 volumes of the adventures of Bécassine appeared. Pinchon drew 25 of them, and Edouard Zier the other two. All 27 were credited as being written by "Caumery", but after Languereau's death in 1941, the pseudonym was used by others.

After Pinchon's death in 1953, the series continued with other artists, most notably Jean Trubert beginning in 1959.

With a first appearance three years before Les Pieds Nickelés, Bécassine is considered the birth of the modern bande dessinée, the Franco-Belgian comic. It marks the transition between the illustrated histories, or text comics, and the true bande dessinée. Its style of drawing, with lively, modern, rounded lines, would inspire the ligne claire style which Hergé 25 years later would popularise in The Adventures of Tintin.

After a decline in popularity, Bécassine regained prominence due to the hit single "Bécassine, c'est ma cousine" ("Bécassine, she's my cousin") by Chantal Goya, which sold over three million copies in 1979. It has been replied to by the Breton guitarist Dan Ar Braz with the song "Bécassine, ce n'est pas ma cousine" ("Bécassine, she's not my cousin").

The popular television show Le Bébête Show, a series that is similar to Spitting Image, showed far right politician Jean-Marie Le Pen in the guise of the puppet "Pencassine".

In April 2005, the French Post issued a stamp depicting Bécassine for her centenary. In contemporary Brittany she remains a familiar figure, with Bécassine dolls and ornaments available in tourist shops.

Bibliography
Source: Béra, Michel; Denni, Michel; and Mellot, Philippe (2002): "Trésors de la Bande Dessinée 2003-2004". Paris, Les éditions de l'amateur. 

If not otherwise mentioned, Pinchon is the artist, Caumery the writer, and Gautier-Languereau the publisher.

Film versions
Bécassine was made into a film in 1940, directed by Pierre Caron with a story by Jean Nohain and René Pujol, and starring Paulette Dubost as Bécassine.

An animated film,  (Becassine and the Viking Treasure), was made in 2001.

Another film adaptation, Bécassine, was released in France in 2018, and Bulgaria in 2019.

Notes

References
Anne Martin-Fugier, La Place des bonnes : la domesticité féminine à Paris en 1900, Grasset, 1979 (reprinted 1985, 1998, 2004).
Bernard Lehambre, Bécassine, une légende du siècle, Gautier-Languereau/Hachette Jeunesse, 2005.
Yves-Marie Labé, « Bécassine débarque », in Le Monde, August 28, 2005.
Yann Le Meur, « Bécassine, le racisme ordinaire du bien-pensant », in Hopla, #21 (November  2005 – February 2006).

External links
 Site about Joseph Pinchon, creator of Bécassine
 Bécassine stamp
 Henri Gautier
 Bécassine resource site

French comic strips
Humor comics
Slice of life comics
Text comics
Comics set in the 1900s
Comics set in the 1910s
French comics characters
Comics characters introduced in 1905
1905 comics debuts
Child characters in comics
Comics about women
Comics set in France
Comics adapted into novels
French comics adapted into films
Female characters in comics
French culture
Brittany in fiction
Fictional French people
Fictional farmers
Comics set in Paris